Antoni Berezowski (May 9, 1847 in Avratin, Volhynian Governorate, Russian Empire – 1916 in Bourail, New Caledonia) was a Polish nationalist who made an unsuccessful attempt to assassinate the Russian emperor Alexander II.

Biography
Anton Berezowski (Russian: Антон Иосифович Березовский) was the son of an impoverished Polish nobleman from the Volyn region of north west Ukraine. His parents taught music. As a 16 year old, in 1863, he took part in the Polish revolt against Russian rule. He emigrated to Paris in 1865 where he worked in a metalwork workshop.

In 1867 when Tsar Alexander II arrived to Paris for the World's fair, Berezowski conceived to kill him to liberate his native land. On June 6 at 5:00 p.m. at Longchamp Racecourse (in Bois de Boulogne) he shot at the tsar who had just come back from a military review (together with the tsar there were two of his sons and Napoleon III, Emperor of the French). His double-barrelled pistol broke off at the shot, and the bullet, having deviated, wounded a horse of an accompanying Russian. Berezovsky, whose hand was wounded by the explosion, was seized by the crowd and arrested. In court on July 15 Berezovsky declared that his purpose in shooting at the tsar was to release his native land; he only expressed one regret, that it occurred in Poland-friendly France. Berezovsky avoided the death penalty and was sentenced to lifelong hard labor in New Caledonia on the island of Grand Terre. In 1886 hard labor was commuted to life. In 1906 he was pardoned, but did not wish to come back from New Caledonia, remaining there until his death in 1916.

References

http://db.generiques.org/biographie/?bio=el&row=97
Berezowski Antoni – Encyklopedia PWN at encyklopedia.pwn.pl
Berezowski Antoni - WIEM, darmowa encyklopedia at portalwiedzy.onet.pl
Корреспонденции газеты “Северная почта” по поводу покушения на Александра II 25 мая 1867 г.
Иван Правдин. Покушение на российского императора совершил Березовский 
Д.Шерих. Березовский метил в царя (Archived 2009-10-25) 
Березовский Антон Иосифович//Биография.ру

1847 births
1916 deaths
People from Zhytomyr Oblast
People from Zhitomirsky Uyezd
People from the Russian Empire of Polish descent
19th-century Polish nobility
Failed regicides
Polish prisoners sentenced to life imprisonment
Prisoners sentenced to life imprisonment by France
Polish people imprisoned abroad
Recipients of French presidential pardons
1867 crimes in Europe